Lyceum College is a college in South Africa. It is a wholly owned division of The Education Investment Corporation Limited, (EDUCOR). It is a wholly owned division of The Education Investment Corporation Limited, (EDUCOR). ICESA Education Services Purchased Educor as a going concern, and took control thereof in January 2008.

Ranking

External links
Official Site
Damelin Correspondence College - also falls under Educor

Distance education institutions based in South Africa
Colleges in South Africa